The Arneth Cantata, WAB 61, is a cantata composed by Anton Bruckner in 1852.

History 
Bruckner composed the cantata for the name-day of Michael Arneth, the prior of the St. Florian Abbey. The piece was performed on 29 September 1852 on the evening before Arneth's name day.

The original manuscript is stored in the archive of the St. Florian Abbey. A facsimile of the cantata was first published in band II/1, pp. 116–128 of the Göllerich/Auer biography.

There are two other versions of this celebratory composition: 
 Auf Brüder! auf zur frohen Feier!, a shortened, 111-bar long version in five movements, on another text of Marinelli, composed in 1857. It was performed on 17 July 1857 as second name-day Cantata for Friedrich Mayer. The original manuscript of this second version is stored in the archive of the St. Florian Abbey.
 Heil dir zum schöne Erstlingsfeste. The original score is lost, but copies of it are stored in the archive of the Kremsmünster Abbey. It is not known whether Bruckner was involved in the realisation process of the new setting.

First version

Text 
The first version of the cantata is using a text by Franz Ernst Marinelli.

Setting 
The 123-bar long work, plus an 18-bar repeat, in D major is scored for  choir, and brass instruments (3 horns, 2 trumpets and bass-trombone). The trombone functions mostly as bass voice of a horn quartet.

The first version of the cantata (WAB 61a) is in seven movements:
 Heil Vater! Dir zum hohen Feste: six-voice  mixed choir (24 bars) - Bewegt
 An dreißig Jahre mögen's sein:  men's choir a cappella (16 bars) - Mit Gefühl
 Drum bringen wir mit Jubel heut: six-voice mixed choir (18 bars) - Bewegt
 Des Herren Ruhm, des Hauses Kraft: men's choir a cappella (16 bars) - Mit Gefühl
 Drum bringen wir mit Jubel heut: six-voice mixed choir (18 bars) - part 3 da capo 
 Du wirktest treu und bieder hier: men's choir a cappella (19 bars) - Andante
 Final Choir Sie bringen dir mit Jubel heut''': six-voice mixed choir (30 bars) - Nicht zu geschwindU. Harten, pp. 192-193

This cantata, the first of three larger-scale occasional compositions, is mostly conventionally diatonic and based on simple structures. Movements two and three are repeated as movements four (with a different text) and five (exact repetition). The work displays already some marks of Bruckner's style. Two horn passages, which recur frequently, provide as in later works musical unity.

 Second version 
 Text 
The second version of the catata is using a new text by Franz Ernst Marinelli.

 Setting 
The second version of the cantata (WAB 61b) is in five movements:
 Auf, Brüder auf zur frohen Feier!: six-voice  mixed choir (25 bars) - Bewegt Wo ist das Herz, das Ihn nicht kennt:  men's choir a cappella (19 bars) - Mit Gefühl Nein, nein die Hoffnung täuschet nicht: six-voice mixed choir (18 bars) - Bewegt Drum schlägt das Herz in froher Brust: men's choir a cappella (19 bars) - Andante Final Choir O Herr im Himmel siehe hier: six-voice mixed choir (30 bars) - Nicht zu geschwindThe repeat of movements two and three was eliminated. The opening section of the first choir was expanded from thirteen bars to fourteen, and last half of movement two was recomposed. The shortened, second version is 111-bar long, plus an 11-bar repeat.

 References 

 Sources 
 August Göllerich, Anton Bruckner. Ein Lebens- und Schaffens-Bild,  – posthumous edited by Max Auer by G. Bosse, Regensburg, 1932
 Anton Bruckner – Sämtliche Werke, Band XXII/1: Kantaten und Chorwerke I (1845–1855), Musikwissenschaftlicher Verlag der Internationalen Bruckner-Gesellschaft, Franz Burkhart, Rudolf H. Führer and Leopold Nowak (Editor), Vienna, 1987 (Available on IMSLP: Neue Gesamtausgabe, XXII/1. Kantaten und Chorwerke Teil 1: Nr. 1-5)
 Uwe Harten, Anton Bruckner. Ein Handbuch. , Salzburg, 1996. 
 Keith William Kinder, The Wind and Wind-Chorus Music of Anton Bruckner, Greenwood Press, Westport, Connecticut, 2000
 Cornelis van Zwol, Anton Bruckner 1824–1896 – Leven en werken, uitg. Thoth, Bussum, Netherlands, 2012. 
 Crawford Howie, Anton Bruckner - A documentary biography'', online revised edition

External links 
 
 Heil, Vater! Dir zum hohen Feste D-Dur, WAB 61a - Critical discography by Hans Roelofs 
 Auf, Brüder! auf zur frohen Feier D-Dur, WAB 61b - Critical discography by Hans Roelofs 
 Heil Dir zum schönen Erstlingsfeste D-Dur, WAB 61c - Critical discography by Hans Roelofs 

Cantatas by Anton Bruckner
1852 compositions
1857 compositions
Compositions in D major